Cleburne County High School is a public school in Heflin, Alabama serving students in grades 8 to 12 in Cleburne County, Alabama. It has about 280 students. Old Cleburne County High School is a historic school building listed on the National Register of Historic Places. Tigers are the school mascot and the school colors red and white.

Its football team was established in 1924.

Old Cleburne County High School
The old Cleburne County High School building, also known as Old Cleburne County High School, is at 911 Willoughby St. in Heflin, Alabama. It was listed on the National Register of Historic Places in 2018. It was built around 1936 and served as a school until 1984.

See also
Cleburne County School District
List of high schools in Alabama

References

Public high schools in Alabama
National Register of Historic Places in Cleburne County, Alabama
Buildings and structures completed in 1936
1936 establishments in Alabama
Buildings and structures in Cleburne County, Alabama